The Marchington River is a river in the Hudson Bay drainage basin located in Kenora and Thunder Bay Districts in northwestern Ontario, Canada. It travels  from its head at Kashaweogama Lake in Thunder Bay District through a series of lakes to Marchington Lake, where it meets the Sturgeon River and North River. It then continues  over the small McDougall Falls and through Botsford Lake before emptying into the English River at Abram Lake near Sioux Lookout.

Tributaries
Houghton Creek
Drive Creek
Runway Creek
Marchington Lake
Sturgeon River
North River
Martin Creek

See also
List of rivers of Ontario

References

Rivers of Kenora District
Rivers of Thunder Bay District
Tributaries of Hudson Bay